Ganymede is the largest moon in the Solar System, and has a hard surface with many craters. Most of them are named after figures from Egyptian, Mesopotamian, and other ancient Middle Eastern myths.

List 

back to top

Dropped or not approved names 

back to top

External links
 USGS: Ganymede nomenclature
 USGS: Ganymede Nomenclature: Craters

Ganymede